Kosmos 782 (in Russian: Бион 3, Космос 782, or Bion 3) was a Bion satellite. It carried 14 experiments prepared by seven countries in all, with participation from scientists in France, Czechoslovakia, Hungary, Poland, Romania, United States and the Soviet Union.

Launch and return 
Launched from Plesetsk Cosmodrome on 25 November 1975, at 14:00:00 UTC. The biosatellite was recovered near Amankaragaj, in Kazakhstan, Soviet Union, on 15 December 1975 after 19.5 days.

Mission 
It included a centrifuge with revolving and fixed sections in which identical groups of animals, plants, and cells could be compared. The subject animals included white rats and tortoises. The effects of aging on fruit fly livers and plant tissues with grafted cancerous growths were also studied. More than 20 different species were flown on the mission, including 25 unrestrained male Wistar rats, fruit flies (Drosophila melanogaster), carrot tissues, and 1,000 embryos of the fish Fundulus heteroclitus (a small shallow-water minnow). A United States radiation dosimeter experiment was also carried out without using biological materials. This experiment was the only joint U.S./U.S.S.R. study flown on the Kosmos series of biosatellites that was developed by Johnson Space Center (JSC); all others were developed and managed by Ames Research Center (ARC).

See also 

 1975 in spaceflight

Bibliography 
 Kozlov, D. I. (1996), Mashnostroenie, ed.; Konstruirovanie avtomaticheskikh kosmicheskikh apparatov, Moscow, ISBN
 Melnik, T. G. (1997), Nauka, ed.; Voenno-Kosmicheskiy Sili, Moscow, ISBN
 "Bion' nuzhen lyudyam", Novosti Kosmonavtiki (6): 35, 1996

References

External links 
  NASA Ames Research Center

Bion satellites
Kosmos satellites
Spacecraft launched in 1975
1975 in spaceflight
1975 in the Soviet Union
Czechoslovakia–Soviet Union relations
Romania–Soviet Union relations
Hungary–Soviet Union relations
Poland–Soviet Union relations
France–Soviet Union relations
Soviet Union–United States relations